North Texas Regional Airport / Perrin Field  is a county-owned airport in Grayson County, Texas between Sherman and Denison. Formerly Grayson County Airport, the airport was renamed in November 2007. Several buildings are occupied by businesses, Grayson County government agencies, and Grayson County College.

Most U.S. airports use the same three-letter location identifier for the FAA and IATA, but this airport is GYI to the FAA and PNX to the IATA (which assigned GYI to Gisenyi Airport in Gisenyi, Rwanda).

The northern extension of State Highway 289 passes the airport on the west side.

History 

The airport is on the site of Perrin Air Force Base, which was built in 1941 and closed in 1971. Since the closure, a group of local citizens have held the memory of Perrin together, hosting nine Perrin Field reunions since the early 1980s. The Perrin AFB Research Foundation was established in 1998.  Today, in addition to serving as a general aviation airport, several businesses, as well as a juvenile detention center/boot-camp and adult probation center are built upon former barracks and nearby areas.  There is a small museum dedicated to the former Perrin Air Force Base at the airport and Grayson County College uses several buildings.  The college also operates the former base golf course.

After seeing the fighters take off from here as a young man, aviation expert Chesley Sullenberger (best known as the pilot of US Airways Flight 1549) became interested in flying.

In late 2018, the proposed Christian airline Judah 1 moved to North Texas Regional, but was subsequently unsuccessful in its efforts to obtain an air operator's certificate and begin scheduled flights. In early 2020, Judah 1 moved to Shreveport Regional Airport, citing a lack of hangar space and facilities suitable for Transportation Security Administration use at North Texas Regional; the airport manager stated that the move would have little impact, as Judah 1 had never started airline operations.

Facilities

It has two runways: 17L/35R is 9,000 by 150 feet (2,743 x 46 m) asphalt/concrete; 13/31 is 2,277 by 60 feet (694 x 18 m) asphalt.

It had three runways, but one 8,000'(2,438m) runway is now a taxiway. The airport has a Category I instrument landing system (ILS) to Runway 17L.  The former USAF control tower resumed operations in mid-2008.

In the year ending April 30, 2007 the airport had 53,300 aircraft operations, average 146 per day: 98% general aviation, 2% military and <1% air taxi. 169 aircraft were then based at the airport: 73% single-engine, 11% multi-engine, 11% jet, 4% helicopter and 1% ultralight.

References

External links
 Perrin Field Historical Society and Museum
 Sherman/Denison, North Texas Rgnl / Perrin Field (GYI) at Texas DOT Airport Directory
 

Airports in Texas
Buildings and structures in Grayson County, Texas
Transportation in Grayson County, Texas